Młynik may refer to the following places:
Młynik, Koło County in Greater Poland Voivodeship (west-central Poland)
Młynik, Kuyavian-Pomeranian Voivodeship (north-central Poland)
Młynik, Podlaskie Voivodeship (north-east Poland)
Młynik, Ostrów Wielkopolski County in Greater Poland Voivodeship (west-central Poland)
Młynik, Pomeranian Voivodeship (north Poland)
Młynik, Warmian-Masurian Voivodeship (north Poland)